Cedar's Blues is a live album by pianist Cedar Walton's Quintet recorded in 1985 and released on the Italian Red label.

Reception

Scott Yanow of AllMusic said, "The results may not be unique but the solos of Walton, Berg and Fuller are consistently satisfying, making this date easily recommended to hard bop collectors".

Track listing 
All compositions by Cedar Walton except as indicated
 "Cedar's Blues" – 11:45    
 "Ugetsu" – 12:40
 "Insight" – 6:50    
 "Over the Rainbow" (Harold Arlen, Yip Harburg) – 6:40  
 "Fiesta Español" – 10:35

Personnel 
Cedar Walton – piano
Curtis Fuller – trombone
Bob Berg – tenor saxophone
David Williams – bass
Billy Higgins – drums

References 

Cedar Walton live albums
1985 live albums
Red Records live albums